Navicella is a genus of diatoms in the family Cymbellaceae.

References

External links 

Cymbellales
Diatom genera